"Pinocchio (Danger)" (피노키오; Pinokio) is a song and lead single by South Korean girl group f(x) from their first studio album Pinocchio. The song was released digitally on April 17, 2011 through various music portal websites by the distributing and record label agency SM Entertainment. Accompanying promotional music video was released through YouTube on April 19, 2011.

Music video
The teaser for music video for the song was released on April 14, 2011 and the full music video was released on April 19, 2011 through YouTube.

The music video shows f(x) dancing the choreography by Jillian Meyers, thus featuring her first work with f(x), and would soon collaborate again in singles like Electric Shock and Rum Pum Pum Pum. The video features two dance sets, one with white carved walls, manual-rotating fans and pyramids on the floor and in the background, another one white set with swirling black and white, giving an illusion, and five individual sets (for each member). Leader Victoria on an orange room with different boxes, Amber on a white room with black drawings, Luna on a red room with checkered red flooring, Sulli on a hexagon blue-green and pink room and Krystal on a blue room in a triangular angle. Throughout the video, the members dance to choreography, gets close ups changing outfit and meets in Luna's set, and a balloon (designed like Pinocchio) appears, startling them.

Promotion

f(x) made their first live performance stage of the song through appearance in one of the episodes of KBS's Music Bank on April 22, 2011. The song "Gangsta Boy" was also chosen to be part of the special comeback performances. "Pinocchio (Danger)" won a total of 8 music show awards: 3 on Inkigayo, 3 on M! Countdown and 2 on Music Bank, the first win was on April 29 in Music Bank. The promotions of "Pinocchio (Danger)" and the album ended on May 29, 2011.

Charts

Accolades

Music program awards

Credits 
Credits adapted from album's liner notes.

Studio 
 Recorded and digitally edited at SM Blue Cup Studio 
 Mixed at SM Yellow Tail Studio
 Mastered at Sonic Korea

Personnel 

 SM Entertainment – executive producer
 Lee Soo-man – producer
 Kim Young-min – executive supervisor
 f(x) – vocals, background vocals
 Kenzie – lyrics
 Misfit – lyrics
 Alex Cantrall – composition
 Jeff Hoeppner – composition
 Dwight Watson – composition
 Hitchhiker – composition, arrangement, vocal directing, sound, guitar, keyboard
 Lee Seong-ho – recording, digital editing
 Jung Eui-seok – recording
 Gu Jong-pil – mixing
 Jeon Hoon – mastering

References

External links
 f(x) - Official website
 SM Entertainment - Official website
 

F(x) (group) songs
2011 singles
Dance-pop songs
Korean-language songs
SM Entertainment singles
Songs written by Kenzie (songwriter)